The FIFA Disciplinary Code (FDC) is a set of codes and regulations promulgated by FIFA's judicial bodies which are composed by its "Disciplinary Committee" and its "Appeal Committee".

The FDC regulates almost all issues related to doping, corruption, arbitration, racism, stadium bans, etc... It also details the code of conduct of football's world governing body.

Committees
The FDC decisions and regulations engages the following FIFA committees:
 Player Status Committee
 Disciplinary Committee 
 Appeal Committee
 Court of Arbitration for Sport

See also 
 International Olympic Committee

References

External links
 Disciplinary Code from fifa.com (PDF)

F
D